Erehwon Nunatak is a small nunatak,  high and  long, at an elevation of , located  northwest of Henkle Peak in Ellsworth Land, Antarctica. It was discovered in January 1985 by chance in a snowstorm and fog by the joint United States Geological Survey – British Antarctic Survey geological party led by Peter D. Rowley. The name is "nowhere" spelled backwards and was suggested by Rowley because the field party was uncertain of its location during the foul weather.

References 

Nunataks of Ellsworth Land